Live in Munich may refer to:
Live in Munich (The Thad Jones / Mel Lewis Orchestra album), 1976
Live in Munich 1977, a live album and DVD released by Ritchie Blackmore's Rainbow in 2006
 Live in Munich (Misery Index album), 2013